Shioli is a small lunar impact crater that is located within the much larger Cyrillus crater on the near side of the Moon.  It is a young crater with a prominent ray system.

The crater's name was approved by the IAU on 12 August 2019.

References